Benjamin Lewin is a molecular biologist who founded the journal Cell and authored the textbook Genes. He is credited with building Cell into a recognized journal of cellular biology in a short period of time to rival Nature and Science.

Following a tutorial session at the University of Sussex, Lewin became editor of Nature New Biology. He left to work at the National Institutes of Health and, while working there, developed his ideas for a comprehensive biology journal. He founded Cell in 1974 and it was published by the MIT Press until 1986, when Lewin bought the title outright, founding his own independent publishing company, Cell Press. Lewin is also author of the best-selling molecular biology textbook series Genes published by Jones & Bartlett Learning, now in its 12th edition. He sold Cell Press to Elsevier in 1999.

Lewin is a Master of Wine and has published widely on the subject, contributing regularly to  TONG,  The World of Fine Wine and Decanter magazine as well as writing a number of books on the subject.

Bibliography

References

Year of birth missing (living people)
Living people
British molecular biologists
Alumni of the University of London
Masters of Wine
Wine writers